Brent Stanton (born 1 May 1986) is a retired professional Australian rules footballer who played his entire career for the Essendon Football Club in the Australian Football League (AFL).

Early life
Stanton attended Banyule Primary School and Viewbank College. At the age of 16, Stanton was selected to play for the 2002 Northern Knights team in the TAC Cup. He played nine games, averaged 16 possessions and kicked 11 goals. Growing up, Stanton supported the Carlton Football Club.

Playing career

Essendon Football Club

2000s
Due to many key players being injured in the 2004 pre-season, Stanton was immediately brought into the Essendon team for the round 1 match against  where the Bombers were comfortably defeated by 96 points. Stanton was the round nomination for the Rising Star after the round 20 win against .

Stanton started his 2005 season by changing to the number 24 jumper, previously worn by former Essendon great Joe Misiti. Stanton had a strong season, in the 19 games that he played, he averaged 18 possessions and kicked 13 goals. In just his second year of football he showed much improvement from his debut season, Stanton finished third in the 2005 Crichton Medal behind Mark Johnson and Jason Johnson with 253 votes.

Stanton worked hard during the pre-season, and was able to increase his physical size. During 2006, he played a different role on the wing, opposite Scott Camporeale. During a horror season which netted only three wins and a draw for Essendon (one of which was against reigning premiers ), Stanton was one of only three players in the team who played in every game that season. Stanton averaged 22 possessions and kicked 12 goals finishing fourth in the 2006 Crichton Medal with 196 votes.

Stanton became a far more prominent player for the Bombers in 2007, he averaged a career-high 25 possessions in the first 10 rounds of the season. Stanton became renowned around the AFL for his endurance and quickly established himself as one of the club's key players and most dangerous midfielders. He finished off an impressive season by finishing sixth in the 2007 Crichton Medal with 197 votes.

In the 2008 pre-season, Stanton would be handed the number five guernsey, worn by retired club captain James Hird. Stanton struggled early in the season due to close checking from opposition players. Although he only averaged 22 possessions and kicked 18 goals in the season, his much-criticised tackling had improved vastly. Stanton finished third in the 2008 Crichton Medal, behind Matthew Lloyd and David Hille, with 188 votes.

In 2009, Stanton was a significant player in an Essendon team which went through the home and away season with 10 wins, 11 defeats and a draw. Stanton polled a career high eight votes in the Brownlow Medal and finished third in the 2009 Crichton Medal behind, Dustin Fletcher and Jobe Watson with 284 votes. Stanton played his 100th AFL game in round 2 against .

2010s
Stanton was elected into the Essendon leadership group for the 2010 season. Stanton amassed 477 possessions and kicked 13 goals in 20 games for an Essendon team which won seven matches and lost fifteen in a year that would see their coach, Matthew Knights, sacked one day after the conclusion of the regular season. Stanton polled six votes in the Brownlow Medal and finished fifth in the 2010 Crichton Medal with 167 votes.

Stanton continued to improve during the year. Stanton led the club in kicks and handballs received and was in the top five for marks, handballs, inside-50s, rebound-50s and loose-ball gets. Into his ninth AFL season and in the Essendon leadership group, Stanton finished second in the 2011 Crichton Medal behind David Zaharakis. He played his 150th AFL game against  in Round 11.

It was another impressive year in the red and black for Stanton. Wearing the famous number 5, his tireless running and ability to accumulate possessions played a huge part in every victory during the 2012 season. He has now become one of the most reliable and consistent players for the Bombers and polled a career high 14 votes in the 2012 Brownlow Medal.

His statistics included: 39 disposals (from 32 kicks and 7 handballs), 17 marks and 8 tackles. As of 2015, it remains the highest Dream Team score by a midfielder.

Stanton played his 200th game in Round 20, 2013 against  at Etihad Stadium.

Stanton, along with 33 other Essendon players, was found guilty of using a banned performance-enhancing substance, thymosin beta-4, as part of Essendon's sports supplements program during the 2012 season. He and his team-mates were initially found not guilty in March 2015 by the AFL Anti-Doping Tribunal, but a guilty verdict was returned in January 2016 after an appeal by the World Anti-Doping Agency. He was suspended for two years which, with backdating, ended in November 2016; as a result, he served approximately fourteen months of his suspension and missed the entire 2016 AFL season.

On 10 August 2016 Stanton re-committed to the Bombers on a one-year deal. Early in the 2017 season, Stanton played his 250th AFL game against the Brisbane Lions at the Gabba.

On 24 August 2017, Stanton announced that he would retire at the end of the 2017 season.

Coaching career

Carlton Football Club
In 2018, Stanton joined the Carlton Football Club in an assistant coaching role as a development coach. He also plays for the Banyule Bears in the Northern Football League who were eliminated in their preliminary final after they were beaten by the Lower Plenty Jabba's.

In August 2021, at the end of the 2021 season, Stanton was sacked by Carlton as an assistant coach, due to a clean-out at the club, after an extensive review of the club's football operations.

Essendon Football Club
He subsequently returned to Essendon Football Club after being appointed its VFL coach.

Statistics
  Statistics are correct to the end of 2014 season

|- style="background-color: #EAEAEA"
! scope="row" style="text-align:center" | 2004
|  || 34 || 15 || 6 || 6 || 110 || 41 || 151 || 47 || 20 || 0.4 || 0.4 || 7.3 || 2.7 || 10.1 || 3.1 || 1.3
|-
! scope="row" style="text-align:center" | 2005
|  || 24 || 19 || 13 || 9 || 252 || 100 || 352 || 123 || 39 || 0.7 || 0.5 || 13.3 || 5.3 || 18.5 || 6.5 || 2.0
|- style="background-color: #EAEAEA"
! scope="row" style="text-align:center" | 2006
|  || 24 || 22 || 12 || 18 || 332 || 153 || 485 || 134 || 41 || 0.6 || 0.8 || 15.1 || 7.0 || 22.0 || 6.1 || 1.9
|-
! scope="row" style="text-align:center" | 2007
|  || 24 || 20 || 11 || 5 || 322 || 147 || 469 || 139 || 28 || 0.6 || 0.2 || 16.1 || 7.4 || 23.4 || 7.0 || 1.4
|- style="background-color: #EAEAEA"
! scope="row" style="text-align:center" | 2008
|  || 5 || 22 || 18 || 13 || 321 || 165 || 486 || 122 || 72 || 0.8 || 0.6 || 14.6 || 7.5 || 22.1 || 5.6 || 3.3
|-
! scope="row" style="text-align:center" | 2009
|  || 5 || 23 || 15 || 13 || 329 || 243 || 572 || 139 || 87 || 0.6 || 0.6 || 14.3 || 10.6 || 24.9 || 6.0 || 3.8
|- style="background-color: #EAEAEA"
! scope="row" style="text-align:center" | 2010
|  || 5 || 20 || 13 || 8 || 285 || 192 || 477 || 122 || 81 || 0.6 || 0.4 || 14.2 || 9.6 || 23.8 || 6.1 || 4.0
|-
! scope="row" style="text-align:center" | 2011
|  || 5 || 21 || 15 || 14 || 343 || 178 || 521 || 107 || 116 || 0.7 || 0.7 || 16.3 || 8.5 || 24.8 || 5.1 || 5.5
|- style="background-color: #EAEAEA"
! scope="row" style="text-align:center" | 2012
|  || 5 || 20 || 13 || 9 || 359 || 137 || 496 || 129 || 86 || 0.6 || 0.4 || 18.0 || 6.8 || 24.8 || 6.4 || 4.3
|-
! scope="row" style="text-align:center" | 2013
|  || 5 || 21 || 14 || 11 || 362 || 162 || 524 || 112 || 81 || 0.7 || 0.5 || 17.2 || 7.7 || 25.0 || 5.3 || 3.9
|- style="background-color: #EAEAEA"
! scope="row" style="text-align:center" | 2014
|  || 5 || 23 || 17 || 13 || 347 || 187 || 534 || 139 || 86 || 0.7 || 0.6 || 15.1 || 8.1 || 23.2 || 6.0 || 3.7
|- class="sortbottom"
! colspan=3| Career
! 226
! 147
! 119
! 3362
! 1705
! 5067
! 1313
! 737
! 0.7
! 0.5
! 14.9
! 7.5
! 22.4
! 5.8
! 3.3
|}

References

External links

 
 

1986 births
Essendon Football Club players
Living people
Australian rules footballers from Victoria (Australia)
Northern Knights players
Doping cases in Australian rules football
Australia international rules football team players